Wartime collaboration is cooperation with the enemy against one's country of citizenship in wartime. As historian Gerhard Hirschfeld says, it "is as old as war and the occupation of foreign territory".

The term collaborator dates to the 19th century and was used in France during the Napoleonic Wars. The meaning shifted during World War II to designate traitorous collaboration with the enemy. The related term collaborationism is used by historians who restrict these terms to refer to a subset of wartime collaborators in Vichy France who actively promoted German victory.

Etymology
The term collaborate dates from 1871, and is a back-formation from collaborator (1802), from the French collaborateur. It was used during the Napoleonic Wars against smugglers trading with England and assisting in the escape of monarchists. It is derived from the Latin collaboratus, past participle of collaborare "work with", from com- "with" + labore "to work". 

The meaning of "traitorous cooperation with the enemy" dates from 1940, originally in reference to the Vichy Government of France, which cooperated with the Germans after the fall of France and during their occupation, 1940–44. It was first used in the modern sense on 24 October 1940 in a meeting between Marshal Philippe Pétain and Adolf Hitler in Montoire-sur-Loire a few months after the Fall of France. Pétain believed that Germany had won the war, and informed the French people that he accepted "collaboration" with Germany.

Definitions

Collaboration in wartime can take many forms, including political, economic, social, cultural, or military collaboration. The activities undertaken can be treasonous, to varying extent, and in a World War II context generally  working with the enemy actively.

Stanley Hoffmann subdivided collaboration into involuntary (reluctant recognition of necessity) and voluntary (an attempt to exploit necessity). According to him, collaboration can be either servile or ideological.  Servile is service to an enemy based on necessity for personal survival or comfort, whereas ideological is advocacy for cooperation with an enemy power.  In contrast, Bertram Gordon used the terms "collaborator" and "collaborationist" for non-ideological and ideological collaborations, respectively. James Mace Ward has asserted that, while collaboration is often equated with treason, there was "legitimate collaboration" between civilian internees (mostly Americans) in the Philippines and their Japanese captors for mutual benefit and to enhance the possibilities of the internees to survive. Collaboration with the Axis Powers in Europe and Asia existed in varying degrees in all the occupied countries.

Collaboration with the enemy in wartime goes back to prehistory, and has always been present. Since World War II, historians have reserved its use mostly to refer to the wartime occupation of France by Germany in World War II. Unlike other defeated countries which capitulated to Germany and fled into exile, France signed an armistice, remained in France, cooperated with the German Reich economically and politically, and used the new situation to effectuate a transfer of power to a cooperative French State under Marshall Phillipe Pétain.

In the context of World War II Europe, and especially in Vichy France, historians draw a distinction between collaboration and collaborator on the one hand, and the related terms collaborationism and collaborationist on the other.
Stanley Hoffmann in 1974 and other historians have used the term  to refer to fascists and Nazi sympathisers who, for anti-communist or other ideological reasons, wished a reinforced collaboration with Hitler's Germany. 
Collaborationism refers to those, primarily from the fascist right in Vichy France, who embraced the goal of a German victory as their own, whereas collaboration refers to those among the French who for whatever reason collaborated with the Germans.

History

Ottoman Empire 

In some colonial or occupation conflicts, soldiers of native origin were seen as collaborationists. This could be the case of mamluks and janissaries in the Ottoman Empire. In some cases, the meaning was not disrespectful at the beginning, but changed with later use when borrowed: the Ottoman term for the sipahi soldiers became sepoy in British India, which in turn was adapted as cipayo in Spanish or zipaio in Basque with a more overtly pejorative meaning of "mercenary".

World War II 

During World War II, collaboration existed to varying degrees in German-occupied zones.

France

In France, a distinction emerged between the collaborateur (collaborator) and the collaborationniste (collaborationist). The term collaborationist is mainly used to describe individuals enrolled in pseudo-Nazi parties, often based in Paris, who had belief in fascist ideology or were anti-communists.  Collaborators on the other hand, engaged in collaboration for pragmatic reasons, such as carrying out the orders of the occupiers to maintain public order (policeman) or normal government functions (civil servants); commerce (including sex workers and other women who had relationships with Germans and were called, "horizontal collaborators"); or to fulfill personal ambitions and greed.  Collaborators were not necessarily believers in fascism or pro-Nazi Germany.

With the defeat of the Axis, collaborators were often punished by public humiliation, imprisonment, and execution. In France, 10,500 collaborators are estimated to have been executed, some after legal proceedings, others extrajudicially.

British historian Simon Kitson has shown that French authorities did not wait until the Liberation to begin pursuing collaborationists. The Vichy government, itself heavily engaged in collaboration, arrested around 2,000 individuals on charges of passing information to the Germans. Their reasons for doing so was to centralise collaboration to ensure that the state maintained a monopoly in Franco-German relations and to defend sovereignty so that they could negotiate from a position of strength. It was among the many compromises that the government engaged along the way. Adolf Hitler was providing Germans in France with plentiful opportunities to exploit French weakness and maximizing tensions in the country around June 1940.

On June 25, 1940, Jean Moulin, a French civil servant who served as the first President of the National Council of the Resistance during World War II, was advised by German authorities to sign a declaration condemning an alleged massacre of Chartres civilians by French Senegalese troops. Moulin refused to collaborate, knowing that the bombing massacre was done by Germans. Moulin was then incarcerated by the Germans, where he would cut his throat with glass to prevent himself from giving up information.

Low Countries

In Belgium, collaborators were organized into the VNV party and the DeVlag movement in Flanders, and into the Rexist movement in Wallonia. There was an active collaboration movement in the Netherlands.

Norway

Vidkun Quisling (1887–1945), a major in the Norwegian Army and former minister of defence. He became minister-president of Norway in 1942, and attempted to Nazify the country, but was fiercely resisted by most of the population. His name is now synonymous with a high-profile government collaborator, now known as a Quisling.

Greece

After the German invasion of Greece, a Nazi-held government was put in place. All three quisling prime ministers, (Georgios Tsolakoglou, Konstantinos Logothetopoulos and Ioannis Rallis), cooperated with the Axis authorities. Small but active Greek National-Socialist parties, like the Greek National Socialist Party, or openly anti-semitic organisations, like the National Union of Greece, helped German authorities fight the Resistance, and identify and deport Greek Jews.
 
During the last two years of the occupation, the last quisling prime-minister, Ioannis Rallis, created the Security Battalions which were military corps that collaborated openly with the Germans, and had strong anti-communist ideology. The Security Battalions, along with various far-right and royalist organizations, and parts of the country's police forces of that era, were directly or indirectly responsible for the brutal killing of thousands of Greeks during the occupation.  Contrary to what happened to other European countries, the members of these corps were never tried or punished for their crimes, due to the Dekemvriana events that erupted immediately after the liberation, followed by the White Terror and the Greek Civil War, two years later.

Yugoslavia
The main collaborationist regime in Yugoslavia was the Independent State of Croatia, a puppet state semi-independent of Nazi Germany. Leon Rupnik (1880–1946) was a Slovene general who collaborated as he took control of the semi-independent region of the Italian-occupied southern Slovenia known as the Province of Ljubljana, which came under German control in 1943.
The main collaborationists in East Yugoslavia were the German-puppet Serbian Government of National Salvation established on the German-occupied territory of Serbia, and the Yugoslav royalist Chetniks, who collaborated tactically with the Axis after 1941.

Poland
There was relatively little collaboration in Poland with Nazi Germany, a point of pride with the Polish people. However, the Soviet Union did find some individuals who would work with them, and this is demonstrated notably by the Lublin government set up by the Soviets in 1944 that operated in opposition to the Polish government-in-exile.

Germany

German citizen and non-Nazi Franz Oppenhoff accepted appointment as Mayor of the German city of Aachen in 1944, under authority of the Allied military command.  He was assassinated on orders from Heinrich Himmler in 1945.

Vietnam

Vietnamese emigres and expatriates living in France gained inspiration from the Nazi occupation in the country. These people believed in many European nationalist ideas at the time — these being a belief in an organic ethnocultural national community and an authoritarian corporatist state and economy.  At the time Vietnamese feared that colonialism had "systematically destroyed all elements of social order ... which would have led the intellectual elite to oppose the bolshevization of the country."

When German forces invaded France in May 1940 amid World War II, the French military and government saw a collapse. In addition, six to ten million people were forced to become refugees. The political response was then provoked by the Vietnamese in the country.

France also had a group of Vietnamese students and professionals in Paris called the Amicale annamite. They expressed a heavy dislike for French colonial rule without moving forward with any explicit ideological agenda. Their motives were expanded in 1943, with the addition of wanting to improve the situation of Vietnamese soldiers interned as POWs. This included improvements in conditions at camps, better food, health care, education, and vocational training.

Celebrities 
High-profile German collaborators included Dutch actor Johannes Heesters or English-language radio-personality William Joyce (the most widely known Lord Haw-Haw).

Postwar examples

More recent examples of collaboration have included institutions and individuals in Afghanistan who collaborated with the Soviet occupation until 1989 and individuals in Iraq and Afghanistan recruited by the Coalition of the Willing. In 2014 during the occupation of Crimea and ongoing War in Donbass, some Ukrainian citizens collaborated with the invading Russian forces.

Israeli–Palestinian conflict

In Palestinian society, collaboration with Israel is viewed as a serious offence and social stain and is sometimes punished (judicially or extrajudicially) by death. In addition, during the period of 2007–2009, around 30 Palestinians have been sentenced to death in court on collaboration-related charges, although the sentences have not been carried out.

In June 2009, Raed Sualha, a 15-year-old Palestinian boy, was brutally tortured and hanged by his family because they suspected him of collaborating with Israel. Authorities of the Palestinian territories launched an investigation into the case and arrested the perpetrators. Police said it was unlikely that such a young boy would have been recruited as an informer.

ISIL

Governments, non-state actors, and private individuals cooperated and gave assistance to the Islamic State of Iraq and the Levant (ISIL or ISIS) during the Syrian Civil War, Iraqi Civil War, and Libyan Civil War.

2022 Russian invasion of Ukraine

The Ukrainian government has had broad support from its population, but support for Russia within Ukraine is common in Donbas. The Ukrainian government compiled a "registry of collaborators." The Ukrainian government says pro-Russian collaborators have acted as spotters to assist shelling of the country. Anti-collaboration laws were enacted by Ukrainian President Volodymyr Zelenskyy after the invasion started, with offenders facing 15 years in prison for collaborating with Russian forces, making public denials about Russian aggression or supporting Russia.

Motivation 

Sometimes people collaborate with the enemy to benefit from war and occupation, or simply to survive.

People belonging to the same ethnic, religious or ideological group as the invading enemy (while being a minority in their country of citizenship) can sympathize with the attackers or even view them as liberators.

The reasons for people collaborating with the enemy in wartime vary. In World War II, collaborators with Nazi Germany were found in Stalin's Soviet Union and in other Western European countries, and Japanese collaborators operated in China.

Public perceptions of collaborators

John Hickman identifies thirteen reasons why occupied populations might hold collaborators in contempt, because they are perceived as:
  scapegoats for defeat
  opportunistic
  benefiting from their own poor decisions as leaders before the occupation 
  violating the norms of the traditional political order
  having no lasting political loyalties
  guilty of more than collaboration
  cowardly 
  deceived by the occupier
  self-deceived
  cheaply bought
  diverting political focus
  representing powerlessness
  escaping their own guilt

See also 

 Chinilpa
 Collaboration with ISIL
 Danish collaborator trials
 Collaboration with the Axis Powers during World War II
 Collaboration: Japanese Agents and Local Elites in Wartime China
 Hanjian
 Hilfspolizei
 Jash (term)
 Medism
 Quisling
 Pursuit of Nazi collaborators
 Useful Jew
 James E. Connolly: Collaboration (France and Belgium), in: 1914-1918-online. International Encyclopedia of the First World War.

References

Works cited
 . (translation from French, Vichy et la chasse aux espions nazis, Paris, Autrement, 2005.)

Further reading
 
 

Collaboration
International relations theory
Political neologisms
Treason